In the 2015–16 season, Espérance Sportive de Tunis competed in the Ligue 1 for the 61st season, as well as the Tunisian Cup.  It was their 61st consecutive season in the top flight of Tunisian football. They competed in Ligue 1, the Confederation Cup and the Tunisian Cup.

Squad list
Players and squad numbers last updated on 16 September 2015.Note: Flags indicate national team as has been defined under FIFA eligibility rules. Players may hold more than one non-FIFA nationality.

Competitions

Overview

{| class="wikitable" style="text-align: center"
|-
!rowspan=2|Competition
!colspan=8|Record
!rowspan=2|Started round
!rowspan=2|Final position / round
!rowspan=2|First match	
!rowspan=2|Last match
|-
!
!
!
!
!
!
!
!
|-
| Ligue 1

|  
| style="background:silver;"| Runners–up
| 16 September 2015
| 12 June 2016
|-
| 2015 Tunisian Cup

| Round of 16
| Quarter-finals
| 5 August 2015
| 16 August 2015
|-
| 2016 Tunisian Cup

| Round of 32
| Round of 16
| 30 January 2016
| 7 February 2016
|-
| 2015 Confederation Cup

| colspan=2| Group stage
| 28 June 2015
| 12 September 2015
|-
| 2016 Confederation Cup

| First round
| Play-off round
| 12 March 2016
| 17 May 2016
|-
! Total

Ligue 1

League table

Results summary

Results by round

Matches

2015 Tunisian Cup

2016 Tunisian Cup

2015 Confederation Cup

Group stage

Group A

2016 Confederation Cup

First round

Second round

Play-off round

Squad information

Playing statistics

|-
! colspan=12 style=background:#dcdcdc; text-align:center| Goalkeepers

|-
! colspan=12 style=background:#dcdcdc; text-align:center| Defenders

|-
! colspan=12 style=background:#dcdcdc; text-align:center| Midfielders

|-
! colspan=12 style=background:#dcdcdc; text-align:center| Forwards

|-
! colspan=12 style=background:#dcdcdc; text-align:center| Players transferred out during the season

Goalscorers
Includes all competitive matches. The list is sorted alphabetically by surname when total goals are equal.

Transfers

In

Out

References 

2015-16
Tunisian football clubs 2015–16 season